Lake Susie is an alpine lake West of South Lake Tahoe. The water level often becomes very low after late summer. A permit is required to stay overnight. There is a waterfall nearby, known as Susie Lake Falls.

References

Mountain lakes
South Lake Tahoe, California
Lakes of the Desolation Wilderness